St Barnabas Church is an Anglican church in Roseneath, Wellington, New Zealand. It is registered as Category II by Heritage New Zealand. It was designed by Joshua Charlesworth and opened in 1899. It suffered fire damage in 1924 and the repairs were designed by Frederick de Jersey Clere. de Jersey Clere also designed the belfry in 1910. It was registered as a historic place on 25 November 1982, with registration number 1421.

References

External links
St Barnabas Roseneath https://www.stbarnabasroseneath.org.nz/

Heritage New Zealand Category 2 historic places in the Wellington Region
Anglican churches in New Zealand
Gothic Revival church buildings in New Zealand
Wooden churches in New Zealand
Listed churches in New Zealand
1890s architecture in New Zealand
Churches in Wellington City